In medicine, pleocytosis (or pleiocytosis) is an increased cell count (from Greek pleion, "more"), particularly an increase in white blood cell count, in a bodily fluid, such as cerebrospinal fluid. It is often defined specifically as an increased white blood cell count in cerebrospinal fluid. 

Increased white blood cell count in the blood is called leukocytosis.

References

Immunology